Ninewells railway station served the area of Ninewells, Dundee, Scotland from 1864 to 1865 on the Dundee and Perth Railway.

History 
The station opened in June 1864 by the Dundee and Perth Railway. It closed to both passengers and goods traffic in October 1865.

References

External links 

Disused railway stations in Dundee
Railway stations in Great Britain opened in 1864
Railway stations in Great Britain closed in 1865
1864 establishments in Scotland